The  is a syncretic Shi'i work originating in the  milieus of 8th-century Kufa (Iraq). It was later transplanted to Syria by the 10th-century Nusayris, whose final redaction of the work was preserved in a Persian translation produced by the Nizari Isma'ilis of Central Asia. The work only survives in Persian.

The work presents itself as a revelation of secret knowledge by the Shi'i Imam Muhammad al-Baqir (677–732) to his disciple Jabir ibn Yazid al-Ju'fi (died –750). It contains a lengthy exposition of the typical  myth of the pre-existent shadows who created the world by their fall from grace, as is also found in the  attributed to al-Mufaddal ibn Umar al-Ju'fi (died before 799).

The work must have been multicultural in language, since it includes Arabic, Persian and Aramaic terms. Orthodox and heterodox Jewish, Zoroastrian, Manichaean and Mandaean motifs appear. The tone and style of the work hint that the authors of the work were probably of middle class origin, with some distance to other Muslim groups, like the politically active Shiites and those advocating asceticism. 

The treatise offers an esoteric hermeneutics concerning cosmology, the nature of man, and worship within a Qur'anic context.

The book may be an attempt to reconcile dualistic cosmologies, as found among the pre-Islamic Persians, with Islamic monotheism. Several principles of evil, such as the Persian figure Ahriman, are said to be merely a later incarnation of the fallen angel Azazil, who in turn owes his existence to God.

See also
 Gnosticism
 Manichaeism
 Secret Book of John

References

Bibliography

Tertiary sources

Secondary sources

Primary sources
 (Italian translation)
 (German translations of parts of the text on pp. 36 ff.)
 (German translations of parts of the text on pp. 113 ff.)
 (edition of the Persian text)
 (partial German translation)

Gnosticism
8th-century books
Ghulat literature
Ismaili literature
Iranian books
8th-century Arabic books